A list of organizations founded/run by the Irish businessman Declan Ganley is given below.

List

Notes

References

External links 
 Who is Declan Ganley? website

Declan Ganley organizations